Sabi Sand Game Reserve is located adjacent to the Kruger National Park in the Lowveld of Mpumalanga, South Africa. Officially named Sabi Sand Wildtuin, the Sabi Sand Game Reserve consists of a group of private game reserves. Other entrances are Gowrie Gate in the far north and Shaws Gate in the south.

The park's name comes from the Sabie River on its southern boundary and the Sand River flowing through it.

Reserves in Sabi Sand include Buffelshoek, Djuma, Elephant Plains, Cheetah Plains, Mala Mala, Chitwa Chitwa, Nkorho, Simbambili, Arathusa, Londolozi, Umkumbe, Nottens, Sabi Sabi, Lion Sands, Kirkman's Kamp, Singita, Exeter Leadwood, Inyati, Idube, Dulini, Leopard Hills, Savanna and Ulusaba.

Wildlife 

Some of the species roaming the reserve are the lion, elephant, Cape buffalo, leopard, and rhinoceros. Collectively these animals are also known as the "Big Five". Other animals that roam this reserve are the cheetah, hippopotamus, wildebeest, zebra, giraffe, hyena, and Cape wild dog. The reserve shares thousands of different plant varieties and all animal species with the Kruger National Park. It is home to 45 fish species, 500 bird species, 145 animal species, and 110 reptile species.

Gallery

See also 
 Lower Sabie
 Mapogo lion coalition
 Wildlife of South Africa

References 

Tourist attractions in South Africa
Protected areas of Mpumalanga
Nature reserves in South Africa